The Black River is a perennial river for most of its length, located in the north-western region of Tasmania, Australia.

Location and features
The river rises below Mount Dipwood (over ) in the Dip Range (over ), and flows generally north into Bass Strait between the localities of Wiltshire and Black River. The river descends  over its  course.

See also

References

Notes

Rivers of Tasmania
North West Tasmania